The Maltese nationalist Mikiel Anton Vassalli, a convert to Protestantism, translated the Gospels and Acts of the Apostles into Maltese language. This was then known as the "Kafir version". Michael Camilleri (c.1814–1903), afterwards vicar of Lyford, Berkshire, revised Vassali's version translated the New Testament and the Book of Common Prayer into Maltese.

In 1959, Maltese Roman Catholic priest and linguist Pietru Pawl Saydon published a translation of the Bible in Maltese from Hebrew and Greek. The translation had a strong emphasis on Semitic Maltese vocabulary in an attempt to keep the original meaning of the Hebrew source. The translation by Saydon was rejected by the Catholic Church in Malta in relation to the language question and political climate on the islands at the time.

References

Maltese
Maltese-language literature